Pan Am Flight 843 was a scheduled domestic commercial flight from San Francisco, California to Honolulu, Hawaii. On June 28, 1965, Clipper Friendship, the Boeing 707-321B operating this route, experienced an uncontained engine failure shortly after take-off, but was successfully able to make an emergency landing at the nearby Travis Air Force Base. The engine failure had been caused by faulty installation and maintenance procedures. The accident was filmed by a passenger.

Accident
Flight 843, carrying 143 passengers and 10 crew members, took off around 2:00 pm PST on Monday, June 28, 1965. After going through the pre-flight check-list, Captain Charles Kimes, 44, let his co-pilot, Fred Miller, 48, handle the take-off. The explosion and resulting fire caused the last 25 or so feet of the right wing, along with the damaged engine, to break off from the rest of the aircraft. Captain Kimes radioed the tower "I don't know whether I can keep it in the air or not."

The pilots were able to extinguish the fire, after which they headed for Travis Air Force Base for an emergency landing. During this time, passenger William Richmond and his wife recorded footage of the burning wing with their camera. Finally, about 34 minutes after taking off, and with the landing gear lowered by emergency means, Flight 843 landed safely at Travis. In the end, all 153 people on board survived unharmed. The success of the landing under the circumstances was described as a "miracle" by the news press.

Investigation
Three days before the accident on June 25, the number 4 engine was overhauled and seemed to work perfectly for 39 flight hours.   
The cause of the explosion was revealed to be a catastrophic failure of the engine's third stage turbine disk, resulting from a loss of operating clearance between the disk and the third stage inner sealing ring. Improper positioning of the turbine rotor, use of the wrong type of tool and worn parts included in the engine assembly process were blamed for that loss of clearance. The CAB accident report states that the inspector on duty during the reinstallation of the turbine rotor "signed off on work he had not inspected".

Aftermath
The number 4 engine ripped through the roof of a cabinet shop in San Bruno. Slashing through a wooden beam, the jet engine then penetrated an 8-inch thick concrete wall, damaging equipment outside, and came to rest on a mound of dirt. A large section of wing came down on Grand Avenue in South San Francisco, starting a grass fire. A  section of the wing hit the ground in Holy Cross cemetery and a charred chunk of the engine exhaust struck the rear of a housing area, also in South San Francisco. No injuries were reported.

While the passengers waited, Pan Am dispatched another 707 to Travis AFB to collect them and continue across the Pacific. This plane's nose gear collapsed on the runway, leaving the passengers dumbstruck. A third aircraft was sent, landing safely. Of the original 143 passengers all but 8 boarded the flight to Hawaii.

Aircraft history
N761PA, Boeing 707-321B, Clipper Friendship, C/n 18336, was  delivered to Pan Am on June 13, 1962. The aircraft was rebuilt and returned to service after this accident. It was withdrawn from use in December 1976, and placed in storage at Miami, Florida. Pan Am sold this Boeing 707 on 10 March 1977, to Dolphin Aviation, Inc., who in turn sold it to Air Manila, registered RP-C7075, on May 1, 1977. After several more operators, this Boeing 707 was bought on May 7, 1986, by the Boeing Military Airplane Company, and used as a source of spares for the Boeing KC-135E program. Reportedly, portions of the airframe are still extant at Davis Monthan Air Force Base, Arizona.

References
Notes

Sources
 

The repaired aircraft made an appearance in the 1966 film Dimension 5 @ 6:02.

External links 
News clip with video.
 Life magazine article from 9 July 1965, Vol. 59, No. 2

1965 in California
Aviation accidents and incidents in the United States in 1965
Aviation accidents and incidents in California
Airliner accidents and incidents involving uncontained engine failure
Airliner accidents and incidents caused by mechanical failure
Accidents and incidents involving the Boeing 707
843
June 1965 events in the United States